Events in the year 1852 in Brazil.

Incumbents
Monarch – Pedro II.
Prime Minister – Marquis of Monte Alegre (until 11 May), Viscount of Itaboraí (starting 11 May).

Events
February 3 - Platine War: Battle of Caseros.
February 20 - the victorious Brazilian Army marches through the streets of Buenos Aires, Argentina.
June 26 - creation of the Federal Railroad Police.

Births
April 14 - Henrique Oswald, pianist and composer (d. 1931).

Deaths

References

 
1850s in Brazil
Years of the 19th century in Brazil
Brazil
Brazil